Elmenhorst may refer to the following places in Germany:

Elmenhorst, Nordvorpommern, a municipality in the district Nordvorpommern, Mecklenburg-Vorpommern
Elmenhorst/Lichtenhagen, a municipality in the district of Bad Doberan, Mecklenburg-Vorpommern
Elmenhorst, Lauenburg, a municipality in the district of Lauenburg, Schleswig-Holstein
Elmenhorst, Stormarn, a municipality in the district of Stormarn, Schleswig-Holstein

Elmenhorst is the family name of the following persons:

 Elmenhorst (family), a dynasty of freemen in Westphalia and an old Hamburg mercantile family 
 Geverhart Elmenhorst (1583–1621), German philologist
 Heinrich Elmenhorst (aka Hinrich; 1632–1704), German theologian, composer of hymns and opera libretti 
 Hinrich Christian Elmenhorst (1726–1779), German merchant and shipping partner 
 Johann Hinrich Oswald Elmenhorst (1930–2011), German chemist
 Kurt Wolfram Carlos Elmenhorst (1910–2000), German merchant and Maya researcher
 Wilhelm Ludwig Geverhart Elmenhorst (1890–1964), German ethnologist and Africa researcher 

See also
, A Hansa A Type cargo ship in service in 1945